The Great Marpole Midden (also known as the Eburne Site, or Great Fraser Midden, and known in Halkomelem as c̓əsnaʔəm), is an ancient Musqueam village and burial site located in the Marpole neighbourhood of Vancouver, British Columbia.

History 

The site was inhabited by Coast Salish people beginning at least 4,000 years ago, until about 200 years ago, with the arrival of smallpox on the Northwest Coast. During that time it was a village known as c̓əsnaʔəm. According to BC Heritage Industry Canada site, the Marpole Culture Type dates between 2400 BP and 1600 years BP.

In 1884 the midden was unearthed during the upgrading of Garypie Farm Road, and was the site of archaeological excavation throughout the subsequent decades. In 1892, Charles Hill-Tout did extensive excavations at the site for the Art, Historical, and Scientific Association of Vancouver, stimulating study of other middens in the region.  American Museum of Natural History archaeologist, Harlan Ingersoll Smith, participating in the Jesup North Pacific Expedition from 1897 to 1899, mined the Marpole site for skeletal remains.  In the 1950s and 1960s UBC professor Charles Edward Borden undertook salvage archaeology projects at the site. Borden "was the first to draw links between contemporary Musqueam peoples and excavated remains."

The construction of the Fraser Arms Hotel in the 1950s destroyed much of the site.

On May 25, 1933, the Marpole Midden was recognized as a National Historic Site of Canada, although the historic marker is located in nearby Marpole Park, while the midden itself is located a few blocks away, between Montcalm and Milton streets, south of Marine Drive.

Proposed development 

In December 2011, a development permit was issued for the construction of a 108-unit condominium project. Intact remains were found in January 2012 during an archaeological dig as required by the permit.  In March 2012, members disrupted planned digging, claiming there was no consultation prior to the permit being issued in December, and in protest over the continued lack of dialogue.

There was a cooling-off period while waiting for negotiations to occur, but protesters returned to the site because, in their opinion, there had been no meaningful progress. Musqueam Band members and the supporters of the Musqueam band staged a series of protests to raise awareness about the site in May 2012. These included a rally at Mountain View Cemetery on May 29, and a blockade of the Arthur Laing Bridge between Richmond and Vancouver on May 31.

On September 27, 2012 Musqueam received the Province of B.C.’s decision regarding the permits issued by the Province under the Heritage Conservation Act to permit a 5 story condominium development at c̓əsnaʔəm, also known as the Musqueam Marpole Village Site. As recognized in the decision, this site was declared to be a National Historic Site in 1933 as one of the largest pre-contact middens in Western Canada and has special significance for Musqueam.

Musqueam is pleased that the proposed development is no longer authorized by the permits issued by the Province and that the ancestral remains are to be restored to their original condition. Their disturbance caused great anguish to the community and the proposed development would have desecrated an ancient and sacred burial place and destroyed a site precious to the Musqueam as representing one of the few links to our heritage extending back thousands of years. It would also have destroyed a Canadian historic site and a heritage site that should be protected for all British Columbians.

Musqueam looks forward to being actively involved in the steps to be taken to restore the ancestral remains in accordance with Musqueam customs and beliefs, steps that must be taken immediately to prevent further deterioration.
 
The Musqueam people have purchased the property.

References

Citation

External links 
 c̓əsnaʔəm at the Musqueam Band web site includes a brief history of the site and recent issues surrounding potential development on the site.

Heritage sites in British Columbia
National Historic Sites in British Columbia
Coast Salish art and artifacts
History of Vancouver
Lower Mainland